Con-Soul & Sax is an album by American jazz saxophonist Johnny Hodges and organist Wild Bill Davis featuring performances recorded in 1965 and released on the RCA Victor label. The title is a play on words based on the term "console organ", which is a term for an organ having at least two 61-note manuals and a 25-note radiating pedal clavier.  Both the Hammond B-3 and C-3, which Davis played most frequently, are console organs.

Reception

The Allmusic site awarded the album 4½ stars.

Track listing
 "On the Sunny Side of the Street" (Jimmy McHugh, Dorothy Fields) - 3:45
 "On Green Dolphin Street" (Bronisław Kaper, Ned Washington) - 3:13
 "Lil' Darlin'" (Neal Hefti) - 4:09
 "Con-Soul and Sax" (Wild Bill Davis) - 4:51
 "The Jeep Is Jumpin'" (Duke Ellington) - 2:25
 "I'm Beginning to See the Light" (Ellington, Don George, Johnny Hodges, Harry James) - 3:25
 "Sophisticated Lady"  (Ellington, Irving Mills, Mitchell Parish) - 4:01
 "Drop Me Off in Harlem" (Ellington, Nick Kenny) - 4:24
 "No One" (Hodges, Mercer Ellington) - 3:19
 "Johnny Come Lately" (Billy Strayhorn) - 3:06

Personnel
Wild Bill Davis - organ 
Johnny Hodges - alto saxophone
Dickie Thompson - lead guitar
Mundell Lowe  - rhythm guitar
Milt Hinton, George Duvivier - double bass
Osie Johnson - drums

References

Johnny Hodges albums
Wild Bill Davis albums
1965 albums
RCA Records albums